
Gmina Szczucin is an urban-rural gmina (administrative district) in Dąbrowa County, Lesser Poland Voivodeship, in southern Poland. (Szczucin gained town status on 1 January 2009 – prior to that the district was classed as a rural gmina.)

Villages
Apart from the town of Szczucin, the gmina contains the villages and settlements of Borki, Brzezówka, Czajków, Dąbrowica, Delastowice, Kąty, Kępa, Łabuzówka, Laskówka Delastowska, Lechówka, Łęka Szczucińska, Lubasz, Maniów, Podlesie, Podradwanie, Radwan, Rynek, Skrzynka, Słupiec, Suchy Grunt, Świdrówka, Wieżyce, Wola Szczucińska, Zabrnie, Zakępie, Zalesie and Załuże.

Neighbouring gminas
Gmina Szczucin is bordered by the gminas of Czermin, Dąbrowa Tarnowska, Łubnice, Mędrzechów, Pacanów, Radgoszcz and Wadowice Górne.

References
 Polish official population figures 2006

Szczucin
Dąbrowa County